Daegu Metro Line 2 is the second rapid transit line in the South Korean city of Daegu. It is operated by the Daegu Metropolitan Transit Corporation.

The line had been scheduled to open some years earlier, but fallout from the IMF crisis of the late 1990s caused delays in construction.

On 19 September 2012, the extension from Sawol to Yeongnam University opened.

Daegu Metro Line 2 will be expanded from Munyang Station to Seongju County as compensation of Terminal High Altitude Area Defense Deployment.

Stations

See also
 Daegu Metro Line 1
 Transport in South Korea
 Daegu Metro Line 3

External links
Daegu Metropolitan Transit Corporation

Daegu subway lines
Railway lines opened in 2005